Jordan Weiss is an American writer and producer. She created and produced the Hulu series Dollface starring Kat Dennings, which premiered in November 2019. Weiss wrote the script for Dollface shortly after graduating from USC School of Cinematic Arts.

In November 2018, it was announced that Weiss is writing a narrative adaptation of the documentary Science Fair for Universal Pictures and Elizabeth Banks' Brownstone Productions.

References 

Showrunners
American television writers
1993 births
Living people